Denis Sergeyevich Churkin (born 8 March 2001) is a Russian football player. He plays for FC Yenisey-2 Krasnoyarsk.

Club career
He made his debut in the Russian Football National League for FC Yenisey Krasnoyarsk on 27 September 2020 in a game against FC Krasnodar-2.

References

External links
 
 Profile by Russian Football National League

2001 births
Living people
Russian footballers
Association football midfielders
FC Yenisey Krasnoyarsk players